Niki Kerameus is a Greek lawyer and politician and the current Minister of Education and Religious Affairs, appointed by Kyriakos Mitsotakis. She was born in Thessaloniki on July 18, 1980 and is a member of the New Democracy party.   

Kerameus studied law at Panthéon-Sorbonne University and Harvard Law School and is a member of the Athens and New York Bar Associations. She was first elected Member of Parliament in the elections of January 2015 and again in September 2015.  During this time during which time she was a member of the "Special permanent committee on the penitentiary system and other forms of confinement of detainees" and the "Standing Committee on Public Administration, Public Order and Justice."  

Kerameus was reelected as parliamentary representative for the B1 North Athens electoral constituency in the elections of 2019 and was appointed as New Democracy's Minister of Education on July 9, 2019.  

She is married to a Greek lawyer and has two boys. Besides Greek, she also speaks English, French and German.

References

Women government ministers of Greece
1980 births
Living people
Politicians from Thessaloniki
Ministers of National Education and Religious Affairs of Greece
Greek MPs 2019–2023
Harvard Law School alumni
Sorbonne University
Greek women lawyers
New Democracy (Greece) politicians
21st-century Greek lawyers